Joseph Hadden Hogsett (born November 2, 1956) is an American attorney, prosecutor, and politician who is the 49th mayor of Indianapolis, Indiana. Prior to being elected, Hogsett served as the Secretary of State of Indiana from 1989 to 1994 and as the Chairman of the Indiana Democratic Party from 2003 to 2004. He was the Democratic nominee for the U.S. Senate in 1992, for Indiana's 2nd congressional district in 1994 and for Attorney General of Indiana in 2004. He most recently served as the United States Attorney for the Southern District of Indiana from 2010 to 2014. On November 3, 2015, he won the race for Mayor of Indianapolis in the 2015 election. He won reelection to a second term in 2019.

Early life and education
Hogsett was born in Rushville, Indiana, in 1956. He graduated from Indiana University Bloomington with a Bachelor of Arts degree. He received a Master of Divinity degree from Christian Theological Seminary in Indianapolis and a Juris Doctor from Indiana University School of Law – Bloomington (now Indiana University Maurer School of Law). He went on to serve as a clerk for the Monroe County Superior Court and many civic and charitable positions.

Secretary of State
In 1986 Hogsett served as campaign manager for Evan Bayh's successful bid for Secretary of State of Indiana. Bayh tapped Hogsett to serve in the position of deputy Secretary of State. Hogsett then managed Bayh's successful campaign for Governor of Indiana two years later and was appointed by Bayh to the office of Secretary of State that Bayh had vacated. Hogsett won reelection against Indianapolis Mayor Bill Hudnut in 1990. Hogsett received 775,163 votes (51.83%) and Hudnut received 719,314 votes (48.10%). Hogsett served as Secretary of State until December 1, 1994, when he declined to run for re-election. As of 2021 he is the last Democrat to occupy the office of Indiana Secretary of State.

Congressional and Senate elections
In 1992, Hogsett ran for the U.S. Senate against Republican incumbent Dan Coats. Coats, who had been appointed to the seat by Governor Robert D. Orr in 1989 after Dan Quayle resigned to become Vice President of the United States, had won a special election in 1990 to serve out the remainder of Quayle's term and was seeking a full 6-year term in office. Hogsett lost to Coats by 900,148 votes (40.8%) to 1,267,972	(57.3%), carrying 13 of the state's 92 counties

In 1994, Hogsett ran to succeed retiring Democratic Congressman Philip Sharp of Indiana's 2nd congressional district. He faced Republican David M. McIntosh and lost by 78,241 votes (45.5%) to 93,592 (54.5%), in a year when the Republicans made sweeping gains.

Despite having been recruited by state Democratic Party leaders, Hogsett declined to run in the 2000 2nd congressional district election.

Democratic Party Chairman and Attorney General election
In February 2003, Hogsett became Chairman of the Indiana Democratic Party after incumbent Chairman, Peter Manous, resigned. Hogsett then resigned in June 2004 so that he could run for Attorney General of Indiana. He was replaced by Kip Tew to be party Chairman.

Hogsett lost to Republican incumbent Steve Carter. Carter received 1,389,640 votes (58.18%), Hogsett received 953,500 votes (39.92%) and Libertarian 	Aaron Milewski received 45,212 votes (1.89%).

United States Attorney

In July 2010, President Barack Obama nominated Hogsett to be United States Attorney for the Southern District of Indiana, succeeding Timothy M. Morris. He went on to be unanimously confirmed by a full vote of the US Senate. 

Hogsett's tenure was marked by an aggressive approach in combating violent crime, public corruption, child exploitation and civil rights violations. Local commentators have described Hogsett's efforts as bringing "more muscle to crimefighting," and he has launched a number of initiatives related to these priorities.

Violent Crime Initiative
In March 2011, Hogsett announced the creation of a Violent Crime Initiative, saying at the time that "for too many young people, it is easier to get a gun than an education. That is unacceptable."

Hogsett said that the "VCI," as it has come to be known, would have four priorities: (1) Prosecute more gun crimes than ever before and increase efforts to identify and vigorously prosecute in federal court violent repeat offenders and criminal gangs, especially those who use guns to further their illegal activities and criminal enterprises. (2) Increase the use of law enforcement and prosecution tools such as court-authorized wiretaps, undercover and covert operations, surveillance, search warrants and use of the grand jury to develop the best possible cases. (3) Actively utilize federal drug laws and federal gun laws for the "worst of the worst" to allow for pretrial detention and stiffer sentences. (4) Aggressively employ a multi-agency law enforcement approach to investigate, arrest and aid prosecution of violent repeat offenders and gangs.

According to published reports, Hogsett's Violent Crime Initiative has produced "dramatic" results, including a significant increase in the number of prosecutions filed by his office against individuals illegally possessing guns. In 2010—prior to Hogsett's tenure—there were just 14 illegally armed felons charged by the U.S. Attorney's Office. In 2011, that number jumped to more than 110 individuals, and in 2012, there were more than 160 firearms-related charges filed as part of the Violent Crime Initiative.

Public Integrity Working Group
In April 2012, Hogsett announced the creation of a first-of-its-kind Public Integrity Working Group targeting public corruption and white collar crime in Indiana. The announcement claimed the Working Group was "historic, in terms of both the number of law enforcement agencies involved and as to the singular focus on such an important issue – the integrity of our public offices and officeholders."

Hogsett's office set up a Public Corruption Hotline to assist the Working Group, which was reportedly modeled after efforts to combat corruption in northwestern Indiana. He has also responded to critics wary of partisan prosecutions by citing his recent prosecution of two Indianapolis city councilmen: one a Republican convicted of taking bribes to grease the wheels for a new strip club; the other a Democrat charged with swindling more than $1 million from an investor.

Indictment against Imperial Petroleum

On September 19, 2013, Jeffrey T. Wilson, Craig Ducey, Chad Ducey, Brian Carmichael, Joseph Furando, Evelyn Pattison, Caravan Trading LLC, Cima Green LLC, CIMA Energy Group and Imperial Petroleum were indicted in what Joe Hogsett referred to as "the largest instance of tax and securities fraud in state history" (in Indiana).  Per the Energy Independence and Security Act of 2007, a tax subsidy was offered to the very first person or organization to mix pure biodiesel (B100) with petroleum diesel.  The individuals are accused of fraudulently selling over 130 Megaliters of RIN-stripped B99 to clients who paid an artificially augmented dollar amount while believing that they were acquiring B100 with RINs and a tax subsidy.

Resignation
On July 14, 2014, Hogsett announced that he was resigning his position as United States Attorney, effective July 31, 2014.

Indianapolis Mayor

On August 15, 2012, the Indianapolis Star published a piece entitled, "Is U.S. Attorney Joe Hogsett eyeing a run at Indianapolis mayor?" The profile noted that Hogsett's visibility and successes as U.S. Attorney had fueled speculation of a return to politics in Indiana, citing both the 2015 mayoral election in Indianapolis and the 2016 U.S. Senate race as possibilities. Hogsett received especially strong praise from former U.S. Senator Evan Bayh, who described Hogsett as "a wonderful representative for the Democratic Party and the people of Indiana."

In December 2012, the Indianapolis Business Journal named Hogsett a 2012 Newsmaker in a piece entitled, "Crime stance returns Hogsett to political spotlight."

In July 2014, four years after his nomination as U.S. Attorney, Hogsett announced he would leave the office at the end of the month. The decision was widely interpreted to mean that Hogsett would consider a run against Republican Indianapolis Mayor Greg Ballard. Media reports indicated that Hogsett's decision may have been motivated by the record-breaking violent crime spree affecting the city.

In the days that followed his resignation announcement, a social media campaign was launched urging Hogsett to run for mayor in 2015. In August 2014, he formed an exploratory committee.

On November 5, Mayor Ballard announced that he would not run for re-election to a third term in office. Seven days later, Hogsett announced his candidacy.  He handily defeated Republican nominee Chuck Brewer with 63 percent of the vote, giving the Democrats complete control of city government for only the second time since the formation of Unigov in 1970.

Hogsett would go on to win reelection in 2019 for a 2nd term against republican challenger Jim Merritt. In November 2022, Hogsett announced he would seek a 3rd and final term as mayor.

Electoral history

See also
 United States vs. Imperial Petroleum
 List of mayors of the 50 largest cities in the United States

References

External links
Bio at Main Justice
Conformation published by Indianapolis Recorder

|-

|-

|-

1956 births
Living people
20th-century American politicians
21st-century American politicians
Butler University alumni
Candidates in the 1992 United States elections
Candidates in the 1994 United States elections
Candidates in the 2004 United States elections
Indiana Democrats
Indiana University Bloomington alumni
Mayors of Indianapolis
People from Rushville, Indiana
Secretaries of State of Indiana
State political party chairs of Indiana
United States Attorneys for the Southern District of Indiana
Indiana University Maurer School of Law alumni